Missy Malone is a Scottish burlesque performer currently based in central England.

Early years 

An only child, Malone was born in 1985 and grew up in Livingston in Scotland. Throughout her childhood she attended dance and drama classes. She studied drama and art throughout high school and spent one school year training at 'Powder' circus school in Glasgow specialising in trapeze and stilt walking. Malone attended Edinburgh College of Art 2003–2007 graduating with a BA Hons Degree in Performance Costume Design. During school holidays as a teenager she worked in a local alternative record store. A huge fan of American popular culture she makes regular trips to Los Angeles. Malone specialised in striptease and acrobalance costumes and corsetry design for her final year of her costume design degree. She makes or customises/creates all her own performance costumes and has styled many photo shoots.

Inspired by classic American pin-up artwork particularly WWII aircraft nose art, she studied this imagery in her art work and costume designs. Classic American pin-up beauties remain to be a large influence on her style.

The distinctive white streak in Malone's naturally dark hair has been maintained since she was a teenager. Her father would affectionately call her 'Mallen' after the family from the 1979 TV series The Mallens.

Burlesque 

Malone is most known for her work as a burlesque performer. As soon as Malone turned 18, she started performing. She developed a wide range of acts and is mostly known several: her stilt walking 9 ft ‘Bride’ act a tribute to the 1935 classic movie Bride of Frankenstein, fan dance with 4 ft long white feather fans, 'Jack Frost' in a rich black velvet cloak, a variety of other acts including a champagne themed balloon dance, a gambling cowgirl act entitled "Ace of Spades", a classic 1950s bump and grind act "Comanche", and several character acts depicting cupid, a nurse, pirate, and sailor.

She quickly was recognised as Scotland's top burlesque dancer. Malone also works regularly with her dance partner Leyla Rose, their double acts include a classic Hawaiian hula, a pillow fight, and a rock & roll military act.

From 2003 Malone became a regular performer in the British Burlesque scene, performing across the country in shows like Candybox burlesque in Birmingham and Torture Garden London. In August 2006 Malone performed at the Italian rockabilly festival 'Summer Jamboree' with her then dance partner Foxy (Rachel) Rouge for over 2000 people. Malone took up full-time work as a burlesque performer from December 2007 when she toured with The Damned on their 'twisted Cabaret' UK/Ireland tour.

She now regularly performs across continental Europe and the UK, she is a regular at the Edinburgh Fringe Festival each year and has appeared in a Bollywood movie 'Raftaar' and on Italian television.

In 2009, Malone hosted a large scale variety show alongside Leyla Rose as Part of The Glasgow Cabaret Festival.  The Missy & Leyla Show was produced by Rhymes with Purple Productions and featured a line-up of performers that Malone and Rose chose themselves. Passing on her performance knowledge Malone now conducts burlesque workshops with her dance partner Leyla Rose throughout the UK.

Acting 

At 15 years old Malone got her first professional acting job in a Scottish (H.E.B.S) Anti-Smoking television commercial (Club Smoking). Other commercial works include a Royal Bank of Scotland T.V Commercial and an Olympus magazine promotional advertisement, she has also been interviewed on several European television programmes.

Malone has appeared in several short and feature-length films including

 Bootprints by King Creosote (2005) music video
 And Yet I feel Innocent by Ruth Paxton (2006) short film
 Big Men by Ruth Paxton (2007) short film
 She wanted to be burnt by Ruth Paxton (2007) short film
 Diamonds by The Damned (2008) music video
 New Town Killers by Richard Jobson (2008) feature film
 Paris/Sexy by Ruth Paxton (2009) short film.

Modelling 
Malone has featured in Bizarre magazine, Practical Photography, Borne Magazine, Alternative Magazine, ScotsGay, Custom Car Magazine, Kustom Magazine, I-ON Edinburgh Magazine, Shimmy Magazine, The List magazine, Pinstriping and Kustom Graphics Magazine, One and Milkcow Magazine. She has also been on the cover of The List, Burlesque Magazine, Leither, Fools in print and Civvy Street.

Newspaper features include: The Sun, Metro, The Scotsman, The Herald, The Evening News, Glasgow Evening Times, and The Courier.

She has promoted and been the face of brands such as Buttress and Snatch, Vivien of Holloway, Toxico, Clutterfly Jewellery, What Katie Did, Lily Lo Lo Mineral cosmetics, Vintage Lime, Olympus cameras, Xbox game "Battlestations Midway" and "Battlestations Pacific". Missy is also signed up to Stolen Model Agency.

Malone has also been painted by many artists including famed low-brow artist Vince Ray.

References

External links 

 missymalone.co.uk Missy Malone's Official website
 myspace.com/missy_malone Missy Malone's Myspace page
 facebook.com/pages Missy Malone's Facebook fan page
 tasseltime.net Missy's Tassel Time interview
 cherrybombrock.com Cherry Bomb Rock Photography

1985 births
Living people
British neo-burlesque performers
British circus performers
Scottish film actresses
British erotic dancers
Vaudeville performers
Scottish female models
People from Livingston, West Lothian
Alumni of the Edinburgh College of Art